My Beautiful Laundrette is a 1985 British romantic comedy-drama film directed by Stephen Frears from a screenplay by Hanif Kureishi. The film was also one of the first films released by Working Title Films.

The story is set in London during the Thatcher years, as reflected in the complex, and often comical, relationships between members of the Pakistani and English communities. The story focuses on Omar, played by Gordon Warnecke, a young Pakistani man living in London, and his reunion and eventual romance with his old friend, a street punk named Johnny, played by Daniel Day-Lewis. The two become the caretakers and business managers of a launderette originally owned by Omar's uncle Nasser.

The British Film Institute ranked My Beautiful Laundrette the 50th greatest British film of the 20th century.

Plot
Omar Ali is a young man living in South London during the mid-1980s. His father, Hussein, once a famous left-wing journalist in Pakistan, lives in London but dislikes Britain's society and its international politics. His dissatisfaction with the world and a family tragedy have led him to sink into alcoholism, so that Omar has to be his caregiver. By contrast, Omar's paternal uncle Nasser is a successful entrepreneur and an active member of the Pakistani community. Hussein asks Nasser to give Omar a job and, after working for a brief time as a car washer in one of his uncle's garages, he is assigned the task of managing a run-down laundrette.

At Nasser's, Omar meets a few other community members: Tania, Nasser's daughter and possibly a future bride; and Salim, who trafficks drugs and hires him to deliver them from the airport. While driving Salim and his wife home that night, the three of them get attacked by a group of right-wing extremist street punks. Their apparent leader turns out to be Johnny, Omar's childhood friend. Omar tries to reestablish their past friendship, offering Johnny a job and the opportunity to adopt a better life by working to fix up the laundrette with him. Johnny decides to accept and they resume a romantic relationship that (it is implied) had been interrupted after school. Running out of money, Omar and Johnny sell one of Salim's drug deliveries to make cash for the laundrette's substantial renovation.

On the laundrette's opening day, Omar confronts Johnny on his fascist past. Johnny, feeling guilty, tells him that though he cannot make it up to him, he is with him now. Nasser visits the laundrette with his mistress, Rachel. As they dance together in the laundrette, Omar and Johnny make love in the back room, narrowly escaping discovery. At the inauguration, Tania confronts Rachel about having an affair with her father. Rachel accuses Nasser of having invited Tania on purpose to have her insulted, and storms off despite his protests. Later that night, a drunk Omar proposes to Tania, who accepts on the condition that he raise money to get away. Soon after, Salim reveals to Omar that he is on to them, and demands his money back. Omar's father stops by late in the night and appeals to Johnny to persuade Omar to go to college because he is unhappy with his son's role.

Offering Salim a chance to invest in his businesses as a much needed 'clean outlet' for his money, Omar decides to take over two laundrettes owned by a friend of Nasser. Salim drives Johnny and Omar to view one of the properties, and he expresses his dislike of the British non-working punks in Johnny's gang. He attempts to run them over and injures one of them. Tania drops by the laundrette and tells Johnny she is leaving, asking him to come along. He refuses, implicitly revealing the truth about himself and Omar and she departs wordlessly. Rachel falls ill with a skin rash apparently caused by a ritual curse from Nasser's wife, and decides it is best for all that she and Nasser part ways. After Salim arrives and enters the laundrette, the punks, who had been lying in wait, trash his car. When he runs out, he is ambushed and viciously attacked. Johnny decides to interrupt and defend him, despite their mutual dislike, and the punks turn their attention to him instead. As he refuses to fight back, they beat him savagely until Omar returns and intervenes, protecting Johnny as the punks smash the window of the laundrette and flee the scene.

Nasser visits Hussein, and the two discuss their respective failures, agreeing between them that only Omar's future matters now. Nasser sees Tania at the train platform while she is running away, and he shouts to her but she disappears. Meanwhile, at the laundrette, Omar nurses Johnny, and the two bond. The film ends with a scene of them shirtless and playfully splashing each other with water from a sink.

Cast

Production
My Beautiful Laundrette was Frears' third feature film for the cinema. Originally shot in 16mm for Channel 4 on a low budget, it was met with such critical acclaim at the Edinburgh Film Festival that it was distributed to cinemas and eventually became an international success.

The role of Johnny was originally offered to Gary Oldman, who turned it down after telling Frears he had issues with the script and the dialogues. Oldman and Frears worked together two years later on Prick Up Your Ears.

The film marked the first time Oliver Stapleton was in charge of cinematography in one of Frears' projects. He later became one of the director's consistent collaborators.

The film was made around Wandsworth, Battersea and Vauxhall, all districts of South London. The location of the building which housed the laundrette on Wilcox Road, Vauxhall was given a rainbow plaque in 2021.

Reception and accolades
My Beautiful Laundrette received positive reviews, currently holding a 98% "fresh" rating on Rotten Tomatoes from 42 critics, with an average rating of 8.2/10.

Hanif Kureishi was nominated for the Academy Award for Best Original Screenplay. He lost to Woody Allen (Hannah and Her Sisters). Kureishi was also nominated for a BAFTA Film Award. The screenplay received an award from the American National Society of Film Critics.

Daniel Day-Lewis received the award for Best Supporting Actor from the U.S. National Board of Review of Motion Pictures, and the picture was nominated for Best Film.

Soundtrack
The original soundtrack, credited to Ludus Tonalis (a name associated with a work by the composer Paul Hindemith), was produced by Stanley Myers and Hans Zimmer. Non-original music included the waltz Les Patineurs by French composer Emile Waldteufel and excerpts from Puccini's Madama Butterfly.

Remake and adaptations
A play of My Beautiful Laundrette, produced by Roger Parsley and Andy Graham from Snap Theatre Company, was played at British theatres in 2002; the play was attended by Hanif Kureishi. The music score, composed by Gaudi and Keita, was released on CD by Sub Signal Records.

In January 2018, it was announced that Pakistani-American actor Kumail Nanjiani would write and star in a serialized television version of My Beautiful Laundrette, based loosely on the original. The executive producers are to be Hanif Kureishi, Stephen Gaghan, and Alec Berg.

A play based on the film, adapted by Kureishi, played at theatres across England in late 2019. It was a co-production among Leicester's Curve Theatre, Coventry's Belgrade Theatre, Cheltenham's Everyman Studio Theatre and Leeds Playhouse. Gordon Warnecke, who played Omar in the original film, played Omar's father in the adaptation. It was directed by Nikolai Foster and featured both back catalog and new music from the Pet Shop Boys.

See also
 London in film
 BFI Top 100 British films

References

Further reading

External links
 
 
 
 
 
 Chicago Sun-Times Review: Roger Ebert
 Hanif Kureshi, Sarah Radcliffe, Tim Bevan and Derek Malcolm discuss My Beautiful Laundrette – a British Library sound recording
 My Beautiful Laundrette at the British Library
The South Asian Britain of My Beautiful Laundrette an essay by Sarfraz Manzoor at the Criterion Collection

1985 films
1985 independent films
1985 LGBT-related films
1980s romantic comedy-drama films
Adultery in films
British independent films
British LGBT-related films
British Pakistani films
British romantic comedy-drama films
1980s English-language films
Films about alcoholism
Films about drugs
Films about dysfunctional families
Films about immigration
Films about interracial romance
Films directed by Stephen Frears
Films set in London
Films set in the 1980s
Films shot in London
Gay-related films
Films with screenplays by Hanif Kureishi
1980s Urdu-language films
Working Title Films films
Film4 Productions films
LGBT-related coming-of-age films
LGBT-related political films
LGBT-related romantic comedy-drama films
Films produced by Tim Bevan
Films scored by Stanley Myers
Films scored by Hans Zimmer
1985 drama films
Films shot in 16 mm film
1980s British films